Metro Transit Assassins, also known by the initialism MTA, is a graffiti street artist collective based in Los Angeles, most famous for its half-mile graffiti "MTA" tag along the concrete walls of the Los Angeles River.

Legal Actions
In June 2010, the L.A. city attorney filed a civil lawsuit against 11 alleged members or alleged former members of the MTA crew. The suit had asked for $5,000,000 in restitution from the 11 defendants and was seeking a first-of-its-kind injunction against a graffiti crew, an injunction modeled on those made for violent street gangs.

On June 20, 2012, the civil case against 11 alleged members of the MTA crew named in the suit was settled with the 11 defendants no longer required to pay the city of Los Angeles millions of dollars for graffiti cleanup. The city agreed not to enforce the injunction against 8 of the defendants (Smear being one of those 8 defendants) as long as they refrain from any "graffiti vandalism" and complete certain requirements. Furthermore, the cases would be totally dismissed when the defendants pay outstanding fines, perform 100 hours of graffiti removal and five years pass without a graffiti conviction. Since Smear had paid all outstanding fines and 5 years since 2007 had passed without a graffiti conviction and he had finished the 100 hours of community service, the case against Smear was dismissed June 20, 2012.

References

Street art
Culture of Los Angeles